"Jezebel" is a  1951 popular song written by American songwriter Wayne Shanklin. It was recorded by Frankie Laine with the Norman Luboff Choir and Mitch Miller and his orchestra on April 4, 1951 and released by Columbia Records as catalog number 39367. The record reached number 2 on the Billboard chart and was a million seller. The B-side, "Rose, Rose, I Love You", was a hit too and reached number 3.

Background
The title refers to the biblical woman Jezebel, a wicked, Baal-worshipping Phoenician princess who ruled Israel as queen to King Ahab. Jezebel's story is recounted in I Kings 16-20 and II Kings 9, books of the Old Testament.

Covers
 In November 1951 Edith Piaf recorded the French-language version, with lyrics by Charles Aznavour.
In 1951 Winifred Atwell charted in the UK with an instrumental version.
 In 1956 Gene Vincent and his Blue Caps performed their version of the song on their debut album.
In 1962, Marty Wilde had a UK Top 20 hit with his version of the song.
In 1963, Rob E. G. (Australian steel slide guitarist), took his instrumental version into the Australian top 5.
 In 1965, Johnny Kendall & the Heralds released a version which reached No. 29 on the Dutch chart. 
In 1967, Herman's Hermits included their version on the LP There's a Kind of Hush All Over the World.
In 1994, The Reverend Horton Heat included his version on the LP Liquor in the Front.
In 1995, Dave Vanian of The Damned included his version on the LP Dave Vanian and the Phantom Chords.
The French language version by Édith Piaf, had lyrics by Charles Aznavour, and was recorded by Piaf the same year as the Frankie Laine version. The Aznavour version was released in 1963.
In 2011, English singer-songwriter Anna Calvi recorded a cover which blends both Laine's English and Piaf's French iterations, released as a single.

Popular culture
In 1951, Desi Arnaz performed the song as Ricky Ricardo in the first season of I Love Lucy.

References

Songs written by Wayne Shanklin
1951 songs
Frankie Laine songs
Shakin' Stevens songs
The Specials songs
1962 singles
Columbia Records singles